Magarey may refer to:

Surname
Rupert Magarey, Sir Rupert Magarey FRCS (1914–1990) was an Australian medical practitioner and surgeon 
Susan Magarey, South Australian historian, biographer, author and academic
Sylvanus James Magarey (1850–1901) South Australian physician and parliamentarian, son of Thomas, father of Frank
Thomas Magarey (1825-1902),  Irish-born South Australian miller, pastoralist, businessman and politician
William Ashley Magarey (1868–1929), South Australian lawyer, originator of the Magarey Medal
William James Magarey (1840–1920) South Australian politician

Things
Magarey Medal
List of Magarey Medallists
Magarey Medal for biography

Places
Magarey, South Australia, a locality in the Wattle Range Council
Hundred of Magarey, one of the Lands administrative divisions of South Australia